Kiyoshi Atsumi (渥美 清 Atsumi Kiyoshi), born Yasuo Tadokoro (田所 康雄 Tadokoro Yasuo, 10 March 1928 – 4 August 1996), was a Japanese actor. He was born in Tokyo suffering from childhood malnutrition due to conditions in wartime. The resulting illnesses led him to re-take 3rd and 4th grade to recover, listening to Musei Tokugawa and rakugo on the radio. In 1942 the outbreak of war with the US forced his middle school class into a factory producing radiators for the military. He later graduated in 1945 but his family home was destroyed during the Tokyo firebombing. 

After his initial ambitions of becoming a cargo sailor were opposed by his mother, Atsumi looked to acting after joining a traveling troop of actors with a friend. He started his career in 1951 as a comedian at a strip-show theater in Asakusa. A bout of tuberculosis resulted in a lobectomy, spending 2 years at a Saitama sanitorium to recover. He made his debut on TV in 1956 and on film in 1957. His vivid performance of a lovable, innocent man in the film “Dear Mr. Emperor” (Haikei Tenno-Heika-Sama) in 1963 established his reputation as an actor. He developed a liking to Africa after spending 4 months there to film The Song of Bwana Toshi in 1965, vacationing to Tanzania multiple times afterwards.   

Later he became the star of the highly popular Tora-san series of films. The original run ended with Tora dying after being bit by a Japanese pit viper. A flood of viewer complaints forced Shochiku to commission a movie, therefore making the show into a series. His portrayal of the main characters lasted from the original Otoko wa Tsurai yo (translated in English as 'It's Tough being a Man') in 1969 to the 48th film released in 1995, the year before his death. 

Due to declining health after 1990 filming scenes where Atsumi was standing were gradually cut down. In 1991 he was diagnosed with liver cancer which later metastized to his lungs in 1994. He died in August 8, 1996 at Juntendo University Hospital, Tokyo. His private funeral included Yôji Yamada and Chieko Baisho as attendees. The enduring success of the series made him synonymous with the Tora-san character, and when he died many Japanese regarded his death as the death of the character Tora-san, not the death of the actor Yasuo Tadokoro or Kiyoshi Atsumi.

Selected filmography 

Otorasan daihanjô (1958) - Hatta
Shima no sehiro no oyabun-shû (1961)
Koshinuke nyûipin sodô (1961)
Daite chôdai (1961)
Atomic no obon: Surimasuwayo no maki (1961)
Tôshi reijô (1961) - Nozaki
Atomic no obon, onna oyabuntaiketsu no maki (1961)
Wakaki ni ho Jirocho: Tokaido no tsumujikaze (1962)
Nippon no obaachan (1962) - Policeman
Oedo Hyobanji Binan no Kaoyaku (1962) - Ushi
Kigeki: Danchi oyabun (1962)
Ottamage ningyo monogatari (1962) - Ginji
Sarariman Isshin Tasuke (1962)
Attack Squadron! (1963)
Utae Wakôdotachi (1963) - Taxi driver
Mushukunin-betsuchô (1963) - Ichibei
Tsumujikaze (1963)
Haikei tenno heika sama (1963) - Shosuke Yamada
Gendaikko (1963) - Actor (uncredited)
Okashina yatsu (1963) - Kashô Sanyûtei
Zoku Haikei Tenno Heika Sama (1964) - Zensuke yamaguchi
Gendai kane monogatari (1964)
Haikei sôri daijin sama (1964)
Ore wa bodigado (1964)
Sanpo suru reikyusha (1964)
Baka marudashi (1964)
Bwana Toshi no uta (1965) - Toshi
Izuko e (1966)
Un ga yoke rya (1966)
Kutsukake Tokijiro - yukyo ippiki (1966)
Ohana han (1966)
Kaachan to 11-nin no kodomo (1966) - Teiji Yoshida
Chichiko gusa (1967)
Kigeki: Kyûkô ressha (1967)
Kigeki: Dantai ressha (1967)
Otoko nara furimukuna (1967)
Neon taiheiki (1968)
Kigeki hachurui (1968) - Seki
Moetsukita chizu (1968) - Tashiro
Nippon gerira jidai (1968)
Hakuchû dôdô (1968) - Katsuji 'Watakatsu' Watanabe
Gion matsuri (1968)
Sukurappu shûdan (1968) - Hose
Kigeki hatsumoude resha (1968) - Ueda
Otoko wa tsurai yo (1969) - Torajirô Kuruma
Kigeki: Onna wa dokyô (1969) - Tsutomu
Zoku otoko wa tsurai yo (1969) - Torajirô Kuruma
Otoko wa tsurai yo: Fûten no Tora (1970) - Torajirô Kuruma
Shin otoko wa tsurai yo (1970) - Torajirô Kuruma
Kigeki: Otoko wa aikyo (1970) - Okera no Goro
Otoko wa tsurai yo: Boukyou hen (1970) - Torajiro Kuruma
Tora! Tora! Tora! (1970) - Cook #1 (Japanese version only) (uncredited)
Where Spring Comes Late (1970)
Otoko wa tsurai yo: Junjô hen (1971) - Torajirô Kuruma
Otoko wa tsurai yo: Funto hen (1971) - Torajiro Kuruma
Otoko wa tsurai yo: Torajiro koiuta (1971) - Torajiro Kuruma
Yaruzô mite ore tamegorô (1971)
Otoko wa tsurai yo: Shibamata bojo (1972) - Torajiro Kuruma
Furusato (1972) - Matsushita
Otoko wa tsurai yo: Torajiro yumemakura (1972) - Torajiro Kuruma
Aa koe naki tomo (1972) - Tamiji Nishiyama
Otoko wa tsurai yo: Torajiro wasurenagusa (1973) - Torajiro Kuruma
Otoko wa tsurai yo: Watashi no tora-san (1973) - Torajiro Kuruma
Tokyo do mannaka (1974)
Otoko wa tsurai yo: Torajiro koiyatsure (1974) - Torajiro Kuruma
Castle of Sand (1974) - Movie Theater Manager
Otoko wa tsurai yo: Torajiro komoriuta (1974) - Torajiro Kuruma
Otoko wa tsurai yo: Torajiro aiaigasa (1975) - Torajiro Kuruma
Harakara (1975)
Otoko wa tsurai yo: Katsushika risshi hen (1975) - Torajiro Kuruma
Otoko wa tsurai yo: Torajiro yuuyake koyake (1976) - Torajiro Kuruma
Otoko wa tsurai yo: Torajirô junjô shishû (1976) - Torajiro Kuruma
Otoko wa tsurai yo: Torajirô to tonosama (1977) - Torajiro Kuruma
Shiawase no kiiroi hankachi (1977) - Watanabe kakarichô
Yatsuhaka-mura (1977) - Kôsuke Kindaichi
Otoko wa tsurai yo: Torajiro gambare! (1977) - Torajiro Kuruma
Otoko wa tsurai yo: Torajiro wagamichi wo yuku (1978) - Torajiro Kuruma
Kôtei no inai hachigatsu (1978) - Kubo
Otoko wa tsurai yo: Uwasa no Torajirô (1978) - Torajiro Kuruma
Otoko wa tsurai yo: Tonderu Torajirô (1979) - Torajirô Kuruma
Ore-tachi no kokyogaku (1979)
Otoko wa tsurai yo: Torajirô haru no yume (1979) - Torajirô Kuruma
Haruka naru yama no yobigoe (1980)
Otoko wa tsurai yo: Torajiro haibisukasu no hana (1980) - Torajiro Kuruma
Otoko wa tsurai yo: Torajiro kamome uta (1980) - Torajiro Kuruma
Otoko wa tsurai yo: Naniwa no koi no Torajirô (1981) - Torajirô Kuruma
Otoko wa tsurai yo: Torajiro kamifusen (1981) - Torajiro Kuruma
Otoko wa tsurai yo: Torajiro ajisai no koi (1982) - Torajiro Kuruma
Otoko wa tsurai yo: Hana mo arashi mo Torajirô (1982) - Torajirô Kuruma
Otoko wa tsurai yo: Tabi to onna to Torajirô (1983) - Torajirô Kuruma
Otoko wa tsurai yo: Kuchibue wo fuku Torajirô (1983) - Torajiro Kuruma
Otoko wa tsurai yo: Yogiri ni musebu torajiro (1984) - Torajiro Kuruma
Otoko wa tsurai yo: Torajirô shinjitsu ichiro (1984) - Torajirô Kuruma
Otoko wa tsurai yo: Torajirô ren'ai juku (1985) - Torajirô Kuruma
Otoko wa tsurai yo: Shibamata yori ai wo komete (1985) - Torajiro Kuruma
Final Take (1986) - Kihachi
Otoko wa tsurai yo: Shiawase no aoi tori (1986) - Torajiro Kuruma
Otoko wa tsurai yo: Shiretoko bojô (1987) - Torajirô Kuruma
Otoko wa tsurai yo: Torajiro monogatari (1987) - Torajiro Kuruma
Nijushi no hitomi (1987) - Narrator
Dauntaun hirozu (1988) - Havaosuke the dormitory cook
Otoko wa tsurai yo: Torajiro sarada kinenbi (1988) - Torajiro Kuruma
Otoko wa tsurai yo: Torajiro kokoro no tabiji (1989) - Torajiro Kuruma
Otoko wa tsurai yo: Boku no ojisan (1989) - Torajiro Kuruma
Otoko wa tsurai yo: Torajiro no kyuujitsu (1990) - Torajiro Kuruma
Otoko wa tsurai yo: Torajiro no kokuhaku (1991) - Torajiro Kuruma
Otoko wa tsurai yo: Torajiro no seishun (1992) - Torajiro Kuruma
A Class to Remember (1993)
Otoko wa tsurai yo: Torajiro no endan (1993) - Torajiro Kuruma
Otoko wa tsurai yo: Haikei, Kuruma Torajiro sama (1994) - Torajiro Kuruma
Otoko wa tsurai yo: Torajiro kurenai no hana (1995) - Torajiro Kuruma
Otoko wa tsurai yo: Torajiro haibisukasu no hana tokubetsu-hen (1997) - Torajiro Kuruma (final film role)

Honours 
Medal with Purple Ribbon (1988)
People's Honour Award (1996)

References 

"Kiyoshi Atsumi, Actor, 68", The New York Times, 11 August 1996.

1928 births
1996 deaths
Japanese male film actors
Chuo University alumni
Japanese comedians
People's Honour Award winners
20th-century Japanese male actors
Male actors from Tokyo
Japanese male television actors
Recipients of the Medal with Purple Ribbon
20th-century comedians